Pachydota nervosa is a moth of the subfamily Arctiinae. It was described by Felder in 1874. It is found in Colombia, Venezuela, Ecuador and Peru.

References

Phaegopterina
Moths described in 1874